SV Heimstetten is a German association football club based in the Kirchheim district of Munich, Bavaria.

History
The club was founded in 1967 and in addition to a football team has departments for basketball, gymnastics, Judo, table tennis, tennis, and volleyball.

The footballers played in lower-tier competition until winning promotion to the Bezirksliga (VII) in 1993 and the Bezirksoberliga Oberbayern (VI) in 1998. The club continued its steady rise with an advance to the Landesliga Bayern-Süd (V) in 2003, followed by a 2006 promotion to the Oberliga Bayern (IV) where they played until 2008, when a 17th-place finish meant relegation for the club.

After another Landesliga title in 2010, the club moved up to the Bayernliga once more. At the end of the 2011–12 season the club managed to qualify for the promotion round to the new Regionalliga Bayern, the lowest placed club in the league to do so, and advanced to the second round after defeating SpVgg Landshut in a penalty shoot-out. In this round the club managed to defeat Würzburger FV on away goals and thereby advanced to the new Regionalliga, the only Bayernliga team to do so through the play-offs. The club finished an outstanding fifth in the new league in 2013 but struggled against relegation all season the following year, eventually finishing 14th and surviving in the league for another season. The 2014–15 season saw the club finish fifteenth and having to enter the relegation round against the Bayernliga runners-up. The club lost against FC Amberg and were relegated. They returned to the Regionalliga in 2018.

The club is affiliated with the Deutschland Fußball Canadian Academy, based at Heimstetten. It also had reserve team goal keeper Ngemba Evans Obi called up for the Nigeria national football team in 2008.

Honours

League
 Bayernliga Süd (V)
 Champions: 2018
 Landesliga Bayern-Süd (V), (VI)
 Champions: (2) 2006, 2010
 Bezirksoberliga Oberbayern (VI)
 Runners-up: 2003
 Bezirksliga Oberbayern-Ost (VI)
 Champions: 1998
 Runners-up: 1997

Recent managers
Recent managers of the club:

Recent seasons
The recent season-by-season performance of the club:

With the introduction of the Bezirksoberligas in 1988 as the new fifth tier, below the Landesligas, all leagues below dropped one tier. With the introduction of the Regionalligas in 1994 and the 3. Liga in 2008 as the new third tier, below the 2. Bundesliga, all leagues below dropped one tier. With the establishment of the Regionalliga Bayern as the new fourth tier in Bavaria in 2012 the Bayernliga was split into a northern and a southern division, the number of Landesligas expanded from three to five and the Bezirksoberligas abolished. All leagues from the Bezirksligas onwards were elevated one tier.

Stadium
Prior to 2001, SV Heimstetten played their home fixtures in the Sportgelände Gruber Straße. Today the team plays in the Sportpark Heimstetten, which has a capacity of 2,800 (190 seats).

References

External links
 Official team site  
 SV Heimstetten at Weltfussball.de 

Football clubs in Germany
Football clubs in Munich
Association football clubs established in 1967
Football in Upper Bavaria
1967 establishments in West Germany
Munich (district)